Yassine Ouhdadi El Ataby (born 20 August 1994) is a partially sighted Spanish Paralympic athlete who competes in long distance running events at international elite competitions.

Ouhdadi qualified for the 2020 Summer Paralympics after achieving the minimal qualification mark in the 5000m T13 at a regional athletics championships in Girona.

References

1994 births
Living people
Moroccan emigrants to Spain
Naturalised citizens of Spain
Paralympic athletes of Spain
Spanish male long-distance runners
Medalists at the World Para Athletics Championships
Medalists at the World Para Athletics European Championships
Spanish sportspeople of Moroccan descent
Athletes (track and field) at the 2020 Summer Paralympics
Medalists at the 2020 Summer Paralympics
Paralympic gold medalists for Spain
Paralympic medalists in athletics (track and field)